Quanjiao County is a county in the east of Anhui Province, China, bordering Jiangsu province to the east. It is under the administration of Chuzhou city.

Administrative divisions
Quanjiao County has 10 towns.
10 Towns

Climate

References

 
Chuzhou